Ronnie Scott OBE (born Ronald Schatt; 28 January 1927 – 23 December 1996) was a British jazz tenor saxophonist and jazz club owner. He co-founded Ronnie Scott's Jazz Club in London's Soho district, one of the world's most popular jazz clubs, in 1959.

Life and career

Ronnie Scott was born in Aldgate, East London, into a Jewish family. His father, Joseph Schatt, was of Russian ancestry, and his mother Sylvia's family attended the Portuguese synagogue in Alie Street. Scott attended the Central Foundation Boys' School.

Scott began playing in small jazz clubs at the age of 16. His claim to fame was that he was taught to play by "Vera Lynn's father-in-law!". He toured with trumpeter Johnny Claes from 1944 to 1945 and with Ted Heath in 1946. That same year, he appeared as one of the band members in George in Civvy Street. He worked with Ambrose, Cab Kaye, and Tito Burns. He was involved in the short-lived musicians' co-operative Club Eleven band and club (1948–50) with Johnny Dankworth. Scott became an acquaintance of the arranger/composer Tadd Dameron, when the American was working in the UK for Heath, and is reported to have performed with Dameron as the pianist, at one Club Eleven gig.

Scott was a member of the generation of British musicians who worked on the Cunard liner Queen Mary intermittently from 1946 to around 1950. The ship would sail to New York City where they were exposed to Bebop, the new form of jazz being played in the clubs there. Scott was among the earliest British musicians to have been influenced by Charlie Parker and other players of modern jazz.

In 1952, Scott joined Jack Parnell's orchestra and from 1953 to 1956 led a nine-piece band and quintet which included Pete King, with whom he later opened his jazz club, Victor Feldman, Hank Shaw, and Phil Seamen. He co-led The Jazz Couriers with Tubby Hayes from 1957 to 1959 and was leader of a quartet that included Stan Tracey (1960–67).

From 1967 to 1969, Scott was a member of the Kenny Clarke/Francy Boland Big Band, which toured Europe and included Johnny Griffin and Eddie "Lockjaw" Davis. Simultaneously he ran his octet, which included John Surman and Kenny Wheeler, and a trio with Mike Carr on keyboards and Bobby Gien on drums (1971–1975). Scott's other bands often included John Critchinson on keyboards and Martin Drew on drums. He did occasional session work, which included performing the solo on "Lady Madonna", the 1968 single by the Beatles, playing on Roy Budd's score for the film Fear Is the Key (1972), and performing the tenor sax solo on "I Missed Again", the 1981 single by Phil Collins.

In the 1981 New Year Honours, Scott was appointed an Officer of the Order of the British Empire (OBE) for services to jazz music.

Charles Mingus said of him in 1961, "Of the white boys, Ronnie Scott gets closer to the negro blues feeling, the way Zoot Sims does." Scott recorded infrequently during the last few decades of his career. He suffered from depression. While recovering from surgery for tooth implants, he died at the age of 69 from an accidental overdose of barbiturate prescribed by his dentist. The Westminster coroner's inquest in February 1997 recorded a verdict of 'death by misadventure'.

Ronnie Scott's widow, Mary Scott, and her daughter, Rebecca Scott, wrote the memoir A Fine Kind of Madness: Ronnie Scott Remembered, with a foreword by Spike Milligan. The book was published in 1999 in London by Headline Book Publishing.

Ronnie Scott's Jazz Club

Scott is perhaps best remembered for co-founding, with former tenor sax player Pete King, Ronnie Scott's Jazz Club, which opened on 30 October 1959 in a basement at 39 Gerrard Street in London's Soho district, with the debut of a young alto sax player named Peter King (no relation), before later moving to a larger venue nearby at 47 Frith Street in 1965. The original venue continued in operation as the "Old Place" until the lease ran out in 1967, and was used for performances by the up-and-coming generation of domestic musicians.

Scott regularly acted as the club's genial Master of Ceremonies, and was noted for his repertoire of jokes, asides and one-liners. A typical introduction might go: "Our next guest is one of the finest musicians in the country. In the city, he's crap".  Another memorable announcement was: "Next week we're proud to have a quartet featuring Stan Getz and violinist Stuff Smith. It's called the 'Getz-Stuffed quartet'." Ronnie often used in later days the services of John Schatt to book rock bands for Ronnie Scott's upstairs.

After Scott's death, King continued to run the club for a further nine years, before selling the club to theatre impresario Sally Greene in June 2005.

In September 2013, while the club was being redecorated, a 12-metre-square (39 ft2) hoarding was placed on the Frith Street façade as a tribute to its eponymous founder, bearing a giant photograph of Ronnie Scott by Val Wilmer, alongside one of his legendary one-liners: "I love this place, it's just like home, filthy and full of strangers."

Selected band line-ups

As well as participating in name orchestras, Scott led or co-led numerous bands featuring some of Britain's most prominent jazz musicians of the day.
Alan Dean's Beboppers 1949
Ronnie Scott (tenor sax), Johnny Dankworth (alto sax), Hank Shaw (trumpet), Tommy Pollard (piano), Pete Chilver (guitar), Joe Muddel (double bass), Laurie Morgan (drums), Alan Dean (vocal)
Ronnie Scott Orchestra – 1954, 1955
Ronnie Scott (tenor sax), Derek Humble (alto sax), Pete King (tenor sax), Hank Shaw (trumpet), Ken Wray (trombone), Benny Green (baritone sax), Victor Feldman (piano), Lennie Bush (double bass), Phil Seamen (drums)
Ronnie Scott Quintet – 1955
Ronnie Scott (tenor sax), Hank Shaw (trumpet), Victor Feldman (piano), Sammy Stokes (double bass), Lennie Bush (double bass), Phil Seamen (drums)
Ronnie Scott Big Band – 1955
Ronnie Scott, Pete King (tenor sax); Joe Harriott, Doug Robinson (alto sax); Benny Green (baritone sax); Stan Palmer, Hank Shaw, Dave Usden, Jimmy Watson (trumpet); Jack Botterill, Robin Kaye, Mac Minshull, Ken Wray (trombone); Norman Stenfalt (piano); Eric Peter (double bass); Phil Seamen (drums)
The Jazz Couriers
On 7 April 1957, The Jazz Couriers, co-led by Tubby Hayes and Ronnie Scott, debuted at the new Flamingo Club in Wardour Street, Soho. The group lasted until 30 August 1959.
Ronnie Scott (tenor sax), Tubby Hayes (tenor sax, vibraphone), Terry Shannon (piano), Phil Bates (double bass), Bill Eyden (drums)
Ronnie Scott Quartet 1964
Ronnie Scott (tenor sax), Stan Tracey (piano), Malcolm Cecil (double bass), Jackie Dougan (drums)
Ronnie Scott Trio 1970
Ronnie Scott (tenor sax), Mike Carr (keyboards, vibraphone), Tony Crombie (drums, piano)
Ronnie Scott Quintet 1990
Ronnie Scott (tenor sax), Dick Pearce (trumpet), John Critchinson (piano), Ron Mathewson (double bass), Martin Drew (drums)

Discography
1948: Boppin' at Esquire (Indigo)
1958: The Couriers of Jazz! (Carlton)
1965: The Night Is Scott and You're So Swingable (Redial)
1965: When I Want Your Opinion, I'll Give it to You (Jazz House)
1969: Live at Ronnie Scott's (Columbia)
1977: ‘’The Pablo All-Stars Jam’’ (Pablo)
1977: Serious Gold (Pye) 1974 Scott At Ronnie's
1990: Never Pat a Burning Dog (Jazz House)
1997: If I Want Your Opinion (Jazz House)
1997: The Night Has a Thousand Eyes (Jazz House)
2000: Boppin' at Esquire (Indigo)
2002: Ronnie Scott Live at the Jazz Club (Time Music)

As sideman
With the Kenny Clarke/Francy Boland Big Band
 Handle with Care (Atlantic, 1963)
 Now Hear Our Meanin' (Columbia, 1963 [1965])
 Sax No End (SABA, 1967)
 Out of the Folk Bag (Columbia, 1967)
 17 Men and Their Music (Campi, 1967)
 All Smiles (MPS, 1968)
 Faces (MPS, 1969)
 Latin Kaleidoscope (MPS, 1968)
 Fellini 712 (MPS, 1969)
 All Blues (MPS, 1969)
 More Smiles (MPS, 1969)
 Clarke Boland Big Band en Concert avec Europe 1 (Tréma, 1969 [1992])
 Off Limits (Polydor, 1970)
 November Girl (Black Lion, 1970 [1975]) with Carmen McRae
 Change of Scenes (Verve, 1971) with Stan Getz

With Victor Feldman
 Suite Sixteen (Contemporary, 1955 [1958])

With Phil Collins
 Face Value (1981) Tenor saxophone solo on I Missed Again

With The Beatles
 Lady Madonna (1968) Tenor saxophone

See also
List of jazz clubs

References

Bibliography
 Clarke, Donald (ed.), The Penguin Encyclopedia of Popular Music, Viking, 1989.
 Kernfeld, Barry Dean (ed.), The New Grove Dictionary of Jazz, Macmillan Press, 1988.
 Kington, Miles; Gelly, Dave, The Giants of Jazz, Schirmer Books, 1986.
 Larkin, Colin, The Encyclopedia of Popular Music, 3rd edition, Macmillan, 1998.
 Ruppli, Michel; Novitsky, Ed, The Mercury Labels. A discography, Vol. V., Record and Artist Indexes, Greenwood Press, 1993.
 Ronnie Scott with Mike Hennessey, Some of My Best Friends are Blues (autobiography). London: Northway Books, 2002. 
 Ronnie Scott's Jazz Farrago compilation of best features from Jazz at Ronnie Scott′s magazine, Hampstead Press, 2008,  
 Ian Carr, Digby Fairweather & Brian Priestley, Jazz: The Rough Guide. 
 Richard Cook & Brian Morton, The Penguin Guide to Jazz on CD 6th edition.

External links
[ Ronnie Scott] – biography by Jason Ankeny for Allmusic
Ronnie Scott discography
Pete King obituary, Daily Telegraph, 21 December 2009.

1927 births
1996 deaths
20th-century English musicians
20th-century saxophonists
Accidental deaths in England
Barbiturates-related deaths
Bebop saxophonists
Drug-related deaths in England
English jazz tenor saxophonists
English people of Russian-Jewish descent
English session musicians
Golders Green Crematorium
Jewish English musicians
Officers of the Order of the British Empire
People educated at Central Foundation Boys' School
People from Aldgate
Post-bop saxophonists
Kenny Clarke/Francy Boland Big Band members